Jerry Kenneth Hernandez (born June 8, 1990) is an American actor and dancer of Puerto Rican and Honduran descent.

Biography
Hernandez is the oldest of two children. Throughout grade school, Hernandez took part in various school musicals and plays. Even though he enjoyed singing, dancing and acting, he did not necessarily look at entertainment as something he wanted to pursue. Towards the end of junior high and halfway through high school, his main focus became his education. His parents' dream was to see him move towards a career in pediatrics after he graduated high school. During the summer before entering his senior year, and going against his parents' wishes, Hernandez returned to his performing roots and began preparing for a talent showcase in Los Angeles called IMTA. After being approached by an agent at IMTA, he was later signed and a career in entertainment soon took shape.

Dance career
Before focusing on acting, Hernandez began his entertainment career as a professional dancer. His main focus was in Hip Hop, Jazz Funk, and Contemporary. As a dancer, Hernandez worked with such directors as Joseph Kahn and Paul Hunter, choreographers like Laurieann Gibson and Nadine "Hi-Hat" Ruffin and musicians such as Madonna and Prince. Jerry also appeared in commercials for J. C. Penney, iPod, Old Navy, Gap, GMC, Target, Jack in the Box and Taco Bell.

Acting career
Since transitioning from the dance world into acting, Hernandez has appeared on television shows such as The Shield, Invasion and Cold Case; film credits have included the American Film Institute festival selection Ethan Mao (directed by Quentin Lee) and HBO's Walkout (directed by Edward James Olmos), as well the short film Inspiración Latina for Coca-Cola (directed by Bryan Singer).

Filmography

Sources 

 IMDB
 NY Times: Movies and TV
 The Advocate: Editor's Pick Film - Ethan Mao

External links 

American contemporary dancers
American hip hop dancers
American jazz dancers
American male film actors
American male television actors
Living people
1990 births
People from East Los Angeles, California
21st-century American dancers
21st-century American male actors